KCMO (710 kHz) is a commercial AM radio station licensed to Kansas City, Missouri.  Owned by Cumulus Media, the station airs a news/talk radio format.  The studios and offices are located in Overland Park, Kansas. KCMO is also heard on FM translator 103.7 MHz K279BI and on the digital subchannel of co-owned 101.1 KCFX-HD2.

The transmitter is off North Eastern Road, near Interstate 435, on Kansas City's Northeast side. KCMO broadcasts with 10,000 watts by day and 5,000 watts at night, using a directional antenna at all times.   The station is heard around the Kansas City metropolitan area, in sections of Missouri and Kansas.  With a good radio, the signal can also be heard in parts of Iowa, Oklahoma, Illinois, Arkansas and Nebraska. Due to KCMO's low transmitting frequency, plus Kansas's flat terrain and excellent ground conductivity, the station has an unusually large daytime coverage area, reaching a population area of nearly 12 million people.

Programming
Weekdays begin with a local news and information show hosted by Pete Mundo.  Nationally syndicated conservative talk shows make up the rest of the day's broadcast schedule. Hosts include Chris Plante, Dan Bongino, Ben Shapiro, Mark Levin, Michael J. Knowles, "Red Eye Radio," "First Light" and "America in The Morning."  KCMO also carries "The Dave Ramsey Show."   Weekends feature shows on money, health, religion, cooking, travel, gardening and horses, some of which are brokered programming.

At various times in its history, KCMO has carried hourly newscasts from either CBS Radio News or Fox News Radio.  At the beginning of 2015, KCMO and most Cumulus talk stations switched to Westwood One News, a Cumulus network.  When that service ended in 2020, KCMO returned to hourly updates from Fox.

History

Early years
The station started in 1925 by Wilson Duncan Broadcasting as AM 1370 KWKC.  In 1936 it changed its call letters to KCMO (Kansas City, Missouri).  In 1939 it moved to 1450 AM and then 1480 AM in 1941. In November, 1947 it moved to 810 AM.  It stayed at 810 for more than half a century.  During much of that time, KCMO was a CBS Radio Network affiliate, carrying its line up of dramas, comedies, news, sports, soap operas, game shows and big band broadcasts during the "Golden Age of Radio."

Walter Cronkite was a sports announcer at the station in 1936 with the on air name of "Walter Wilcox". While at KCMO, Cronkite met his wife, Mary Elizabeth Maxwell, and later left to become a reporter for United Press International, before becoming a long-time TV anchor for CBS News.

Acquisition by Meredith Corp.
In 1953, television station KCMO-TV (now KCTV) was launched.  The Meredith Corporation acquired both the radio and television stations in October 1953, less than a month after the television station went on the air.  Meredith later acquired what became KCMO-FM, 94.9 FM. In 1955, it switched network affiliations to CBS Radio, swapping network affiliations with KMBC-AM, as part of a group deal that Meredith saw a radio and TV affiliation deal with CBS in three cities for five stations

In 1978 Meredith built a new facility for its broadcasting stations in Fairway, Kansas.  The radio stations were spun off from the television station in 1983.  Later, the TV station changed its call letters to KCTV.  (Meredith continues to own KCTV to this day.)  That year, Richard Fairbanks (a one-time owner of what is today WXIA-TV in Atlanta, Georgia) bought both KCMO and KCMO-FM.

The stations were then sold to the Summit Communications Group in 1985, then to the Gannett Company in 1986.  Bonneville International, which already owned rival stations KMBZ and KLTH (now KZPT), acquired both KCMO stations in 1993.

Sale to Entercom and switch to AM 710
In 1997, Bonneville sold its entire Kansas City cluster plus three radio stations in Seattle to Entercom Communications.  On October 3, 1997, shortly after Entercom assumed control of the KCMO stations, KCMO swapped frequencies with WHB, with KCMO moving to its present-day dial position of 710 AM and WHB relocating to 810 AM.  Due to the way the switch was structured, the Federal Communications Commission (FCC) considers KCMO to be legally the same station as the old WHB.

In 2000, Entercom was forced to sell both KCMO stations to Susquehanna Radio after its purchase of Sinclair Broadcasting's Kansas City properties, KQRC-FM, KXTR-FM and WDAF-FM.  The acquisition left Entercom two stations over the FCC's single-market ownership limit.  Cumulus Media became the owner of both KCMO and its FM sister station in 2006 with its acquisition of Susquehanna.

Changes under Cumulus ownership
When Cumulus assumed control of the station in mid-2006, local morning host Van Patrick quit on air, apparently upset over the firing of his producer as well as others in the building, during a national layoff of Cumulus employees.  On September 12, the station began a new morning show, hosted by Chris Stigall.  Stigall has since left the station, being replaced by Rob Carson.  Carson was later replaced by Gregg Knapp as morning host.  Pete Mundo is the latest morning drive time personality.

On April 30, 2012, KCMO began simulcasting on FM translator 103.7 K279BI via KCFX-HD2.

Controversy
In light of Michael Savage's controversial remarks concerning Islam, a group of 70 representatives from various local religious groups including Christianity, Buddhism, Judaism and Islam, gathered in a May 2008 interfaith meeting against alleged bigotry and urged KCMO to drop Savage's program.  Savage's show, "The Savage Nation," was syndicated by Westwood One Network, co-owned with KCMO, and heard afternoons on AM 710.

Former hosts
 Don Harrison
 Rusty Humphries
 Rick Roberts
 Chris Baker
 Claudia Lamb
 Scott Mayman
 Kevin Harlan
 Conrad Dobler
 Wayne Larrivee
 Harold Ensley
 Dr. Marshall Saper
 Mike Murphy
 John Boss
 Al Eschbach
 Beth Albright
 Dave Dawson
 Bob Doyle
 Terry Hickman
 Jamie McFerrin
 Bobbi Marks

See also
Right Between the Ears

References

External links

CMO
News and talk radio stations in the United States
Radio stations established in 1948
1948 establishments in Missouri
Cumulus Media radio stations
Kansas City Kings
Kansas City Scouts